Paul Durant (born September 26, 1959), is a former American racecar driver from San Diego, California.

He first excelled in modified stock car racing, winning a number of regional championships. He then competed in the USAC Silver Crown Series in 1994. Following the founding of the Indy Racing League in 1996, he competed in the series' second ever race at the Phoenix International Raceway but broke on the first lap. Two months later, he competed in the Indianapolis 500, qualifying the oldest car in the field, a 1992 Lola powered by a stock-block Buick V6 engine in the 24th position. He moved up from 24th to 18th in 9 laps before his engine failed. The following year he took over A. J. Foyt Enterprises' #1 car late on bump day and qualified in the final position with only 12 laps of practice in the car. He crashed on lap 111 of the race and was credited with 21st. Later that season he drove at Las Vegas Motor Speedway for Byrd-Cunningham Racing and finished 26th after a mechanical issue on lap 62. He drove in the first race of the 1998 season at Phoenix for Cobb Racing but suffered an engine failure 99 laps in. He failed to qualify for the 1998 Indianapolis 500 in the same car and his entry failed to arrive at the race the following week at Texas Motor Speedway despite being entered.

He currently lives in Denver, Colorado.

Racing record

American Open Wheel
(key)

IndyCar

Indy 500 results

References

External links
Paul Durant at ChampCarStats.com

1959 births
Indianapolis 500 drivers
IndyCar Series drivers
Living people
Racing drivers from San Diego
USAC Silver Crown Series drivers

A. J. Foyt Enterprises drivers